José Ramalho Carvalho de Freitas, or simply Ramalho (born June 3, 1980 in Natal), is a Brazilian defensive midfielder.

He joined Beitar Jerusalem, of Israel, where he played with two other Brazilians of that team, Cléber Schwenck and Tuto Ruschel, and was signed as a replacement for another Brazilian, Joeano Pinto Chaves.

External links
  Profile and statistics of Ramalho on One.co.il

1980 births
Living people
People from Natal, Rio Grande do Norte
Brazilian footballers
Association football midfielders
Brazilian expatriate footballers
Expatriate footballers in Israel
Campeonato Brasileiro Série A players
Campeonato Brasileiro Série B players
Campeonato Brasileiro Série C players
Campeonato Brasileiro Série D players
Israeli Premier League players
Esporte Clube Santo André players
Esporte Clube Vitória players
São Paulo FC players
Beitar Jerusalem F.C. players
Maccabi Tel Aviv F.C. players
Goiás Esporte Clube players
Atlético Clube Goianiense players
Criciúma Esporte Clube players
Esporte Clube Rio Verde players
Clube Atlético Sorocaba players
Associação Desportiva São Caetano players
Paulista Futebol Clube players
Agremiação Sportiva Arapiraquense players
Club Sportivo Sergipe players
Sportspeople from Rio Grande do Norte